The Yamato Glacier is a glacier about 6 miles (10 km) wide, flowing west between Mount Fukushima and Mount Eyskens in the Queen Fabiola Mountains of Antarctica.

Discovered by the Belgian Antarctic Expedition under Guido Derom, October 7, 1960, and named after an old name of the cove of Honshū.  Yamato is the symbol of the political unity and the national consciousness of the Japanese people. In November–December 1960, a Japanese field party reached this area and carried out geodetic and other scientific work.

See also
 List of glaciers in the Antarctic
 Glaciology

References
 

Glaciers of Queen Maud Land
Prince Harald Coast